The Speed of Thought is a 2011 American thriller film written and directed by Evan Oppenheimer and starring Nick Stahl, Taryn Manning, and Mía Maestro.

Synopsis
Joshua Lazarus (Nick Stahl) is a telepath who has been raised in an NSA foster home.  Lazarus helps the government by using his abilities.  He is told by the agency that the telepathy is a side effect of Widmann's Disease, and that he will become insane in time and eventually die from the illness.  However, Lazarus meets a woman with similar powers (Mía Maestro) who does not have any sign of the disease, launching Lazarus to confront the lies he has been told.

Cast
Nick Stahl as Joshua Lazarus
Mía Maestro as Anna Manheim
Taryn Manning as Kira
Wallace Shawn as Sandy
Blair Brown as Bridger
Erik Palladino as Butler
Alan Cox as Alexei

Production
Filming took place in Punta del Este, Uruguay and New York City.

Soundtrack
The songs featured during the movie are as follows:
"Honey" by El Presidente
"Cerulean" by James Dean
"Cave In" by The Picture
"Illi Villi" by Sophocles Jones
"Today" by Joshua James

References

External links

Films shot in New York (state)
Films shot in Uruguay
Films about telepathy
2010s English-language films